Mohammad Usman Advocate is a Pakistani politician who was a member of the National Assembly of Pakistan from 2008 to 2013.

Political career
He was elected to the National Assembly of Pakistan from Constituency NA-269 (Khuzdar) as an independent candidate in 2008 Pakistani general election. He received 17,609 votes and defeated Molana Qamar ud Din. In the same election, he ran for the seat of the Provincial Assembly of Balochistan from Constituency PB-33 (Khuzdar-I) as an independent candidate but was unsuccessful. He received 399 votes and lost the seat to Sanaullah Khan Zehri.

References

Living people
Pakistani MNAs 2008–2013
Year of birth missing (living people)